The 2017–18 season was Manchester United's 26th season in the Premier League and their 43rd consecutive season in the top flight of English football. The season was the first since 2003–04 without former club captain Wayne Rooney, who rejoined Everton after 13 seasons with United, during which time he overtook Bobby Charlton as their all-time top scorer. United also returned to the Champions League after a single season's absence, having won the 2016–17 UEFA Europa League.

United achieved their highest points total and league placing since the retirement of Sir Alex Ferguson in 2013, amassing 81 points to finish second in the Premier League. However, despite winning three cups the previous season, the club failed to secure silverware this time around, also finishing as runners-up in both the UEFA Super Cup and FA Cup. United also suffered disappointing exits in both the EFL Cup and Champions League, bowing out to Bristol City and Sevilla respectively by 2–1 scorelines. Throughout the season, despite having a wealth of attacking options and completing the signing of Alexis Sánchez in January, manager José Mourinho was criticised by sections of the media and a section of United supporters for a perceived negative playing style.

Pre-season and friendlies

United preceded their 2017–18 campaign with a tour of the United States, which included the first Manchester derby to be played outside the United Kingdom, in the International Champions Cup. The tour also included games against Real Madrid and Barcelona. The US tour started against LA Galaxy on 15 July 2017. United then faced Vålerenga in Norway. The final preparations during pre-season included a trip to the Republic of Ireland to face Sampdoria.

UEFA Super Cup

Manchester United, as winners of the 2016–17 UEFA Europa League faced Real Madrid, winners of the 2016–17 UEFA Champions League for the 2017 UEFA Super Cup on 8 August 2017, at the Philip II Arena in Skopje, Macedonia.

Premier League

The Premier League season began on 11 August 2017 and concluded on 13 May 2018. Michael Carrick played his final match against Watford as captain. He was subbed off in the 85th minute for Paul Pogba. He also received a guard of honour from both sets of players before the kick-off. This was also his 464th appearance for United.

FA Cup 

Manchester United entered the FA Cup in the third round as all 20 Premier League clubs automatically received a bye to that stage. Matches were played between 5–8 January 2018.

EFL Cup 

Manchester United entered the EFL Cup as holders, having beaten Southampton in the 2017 final. As one of the seven clubs that qualified for European competition in 2017–18, they entered the EFL Cup in the third round, the draw for which was held on 24 August, with Manchester United being paired with Championship club Burton Albion. The two sides last met in the third round of the 2005–06 FA Cup, with United winning a replay 5–0 at Old Trafford following a goalless draw at the Pirelli Stadium. The fourth round draw confirmed the Red Devils visited Swansea City. The fifth round draw was held on 26 October 2017, with United drawn against another Championship side Bristol City.

UEFA Champions League

Group stage

Manchester United qualified for the group stage of the Champions League as winners of the 2016–17 UEFA Europa League and were placed in pot 2 for the group stage draw. The draw was made on 24 August 2017, with Manchester United drawn alongside Benfica, Basel and CSKA Moscow. United were previously drawn with both Benfica and Basel in 2011–12, and with CSKA Moscow in 2009–10 and 2015–16; in 2011–12 and 2015–16, they finished third in the group and dropped down to the UEFA Europa League, while in 2009–10, United topped the group.

Knockout phase

After winning their group and progressing to the round of 16, United were drawn against Spanish club Sevilla in the first competitive meeting between the two sides. After a goalless draw in the first leg at the Ramón Sánchez Pizjuán Stadium, Sevilla took the lead in the tie late in the second leg, when Wissam Ben Yedder scored twice within minutes of coming on as a substitute. Romelu Lukaku pulled one back for United six minutes from the end, but they were unable to score the two further goals required to avoid elimination.

Squad statistics

Statistics accurate as of 19 May 2018.

Transfers

In

Out

Loan out

Notes

References

Manchester United F.C. seasons
Manchester United
Manchester United